Whitcomb Court is a Public Housing Project in the East End part of Richmond, Virginia that is north of Union Hill. The Housing Project is tucked away by the interchange of U.S. Route 360 Mechanicsville Turnpike and Interstate 64. Whitcomb and Sussex St. serve as the spine of the community.

Origins  
Whitcomb Court is the fourth eldest housing project out of six in Richmond, Virginia. Housing projects in Richmond began sometime after the great depression in the 1940s. The moniker “Projects” is short for “Slum Clearance Projects.” White authorities meant to “claim” and “demolish” the African-American ghettos within Richmond and replace them with “new”, “healthier” buildings. The establishments that stand now were once mere shanties without water or indoor plumbing prior to government interference. Authorities made themselves out to be heroes after the seizing and conquering these African-American communities however, their true motives were to keep whites and blacks segregated.

See also 
 Neighborhoods of Richmond, Virginia
 Richmond, Virginia
 Union Hill

References 

Neighborhoods in Richmond, Virginia